CBS Action was a Polish pay television channel specialising in action, drama and murder-mysteries programs, launched on 3 December 2012.

On 1 August 2012 Chellomedia revealed that all European versions of the Zone Channels would be rebranded into CBS Channels. CBS Action replaced Zone Romantica in Poland on 3 December 2012.

References

External links
CBS Action

AMC Networks International
Paramount International Networks
Television channels and stations established in 2012
Television channels and stations disestablished in 2019